Bryan Starling De La Cruz (born December 16, 1996) is a Dominican professional baseball outfielder for the Miami Marlins of Major League Baseball (MLB). He made his MLB debut in 2021.

Career

Houston Astros
De La Cruz signed with the Houston Astros organization as an international free agent on September 24, 2013, for a $170,000 signing bonus. He spent his professional debut season with the Dominican Summer League Astros, hitting 262/.387/.317/.704 with one home run and 22 runs batted in (RBIs). His 2015 season was spent with the Gulf Coast League Astros, hitting .242/.313/.268/.582 with 12 RBIs. He split the 2016 season between the Greeneville Astros and the Tri-City ValleyCats, hitting a combined .239/.331/.396/.727 with three home runs and 18 RBIs. He split the 2017 season between Tri-City, the Quad Cities River Bandits and the Corpus Christi Hooks, hitting a combined .244/.290/.335/.625 with two home runs and 21 RBIs.

In the 2018 season, De La Cruz played for Quad Cities and the Buies Creek Astros, hitting a combined .289/.367/.375/.742 with two home runs and 62 RBIs. De La Cruz split the 2019 season between the Fayetteville Woodpeckers and Corpus Christi, hitting a combined .280/.340/.428/.768 with eight home runs and 43 RBIs. De La Cruz did not play in a game in 2020 due to the cancellation of the Minor League Baseball season because of the COVID-19 pandemic. He opened the 2021 season with the Sugar Land Skeeters, hitting .324/.362/.518/.880 with 12 home runs and 50 RBIs over 66 games with them.

Miami Marlins
On July 28, 2021, the Astros traded De La Cruz and Austin Pruitt to the Miami Marlins in exchange for Yimi García. On July 30, Miami selected his contract and promoted him to the major leagues. He made his MLB debut that night against the New York Yankees. On August 13, De La Cruz hit his first career grand slam off of Chicago Cubs starter Adbert Alzolay.

De La Cruz made the Marlins Opening Day roster for the 2022 season.

References

External links

1996 births
Living people
People from Santo Domingo Province
Dominican Republic expatriate baseball players in the United States
Major League Baseball players from the Dominican Republic
Major League Baseball outfielders
Miami Marlins players
Dominican Summer League Astros players
Gulf Coast Astros players
Greeneville Astros players
Tri-City ValleyCats players
Quad Cities River Bandits players
Buies Creek Astros players
Fayetteville Woodpeckers players
Corpus Christi Hooks players
Sugar Land Skeeters players
Toros del Este players